The George Sugarman Foundation, Inc. is a non-profit organization founded in 2001 to honor the memory and wishes of George Sugarman.

History

George Sugarman (1912–1999) was an American artist working in the mediums of drawing, painting, and sculpture.  Often described as controversial and forward-thinking, Sugarman's prolific body of work defies a definitive style. He pioneered the concepts of pedestal-free sculpture and is best known for his large-scale, vividly painted metal sculptures.  His innovative approach to art-making lent his work a fresh, experimental approach and caused him to continually expand his creative focus. During his lifetime, he was dedicated to the well-being of young emerging artists, particularly those who embraced innovation and risk-taking in their work.  In his will, Sugarman provided for the establishment of The George Sugarman Foundation, Inc.

Foundation work

From 2001 to 2008, the George Sugarman Foundation awarded monetary grants to emerging visual artists who were engaged in creating new works of fine art and whose work showed promise and conceptual innovation.  As of 2009, the George Sugarman Foundation, Inc. shifted its focus away from offering grants to artists in order to serve the wishes of George Sugarman through the donation of his artwork to American institutions, museums, and universities.

Grant recipients
2001

Joan Bankemper
Paula Busch
Steve "Pablo" Davis
Helene Lhote
Marsha Rich
Paul Salscheider
Harry Simpson
Mark Taylor
Marvin Werlin

2002

Romolo Del Deo
Cynthia K. Evans
Darlys Ewoldt
Jan Frank
Edgar Jerins
Caspar Henselmann
Nathan Horner
China Marks
Susan Matthews
Phyllis Gay Palmer
Jerry Dane Sanders
Eric B. Semelroth
Julie Orsini Shakher

2003

Sachiko Akiyama
Timothy Blum
Holly Boruck
Anne Boysen
Matt Brackett
Virginia Bryant
Shaila Christofferson
Edith Dakovic
Pamela Dodds
Theresa Durand
Emily Ehmer
Keina Davis Elswick
Mara Held
Kathleen Holmes
Michael J. Kane
Jarmo Karjalainen
Biganess Livingstone
Nestor Madalengoitia
Mario Naves
Chris Piazza
Betty Schoenberg
Diane Van der Zanden
Alex Walker

2004

Jonathan Allen
Lauren Baker
Daniel Bilodeau
Gina Blickenstaff
Timothy Blum
Aaron Board
Shelly Bradbury
Noah Buchanan
Claudia Cohen
Donna Coleman
Andrew Conklin
Tamra Conner
Dianne Corbeau
Ian Everard
Cristina Figueredo
Frankie Flood
Rik Freeman
Nancy Friese
Susan Hagen
Susan Hauptman
David Hayes (sculptor)
Sean Hopp
Leeah Joo
Ellen Kozak
Adela Leibowitz
Kristin Lerner
Kimberly Maier
Sandy Oppenheimer
Xan Palay
Gael Perrin
Jane Richlovsky
Steff Rocknak
Joan Ryan
Eleanor Seeley
Rosa Valado

2005

Sony Marlon
Ejiro Akpotor
James Xavier Barbour
Michele Benzamin-Miki
Tom Block
Jeanne Marie Ferraro
Michael Ferris, Jr.
Cristina Figueredo
Rossy Finol
Kathleen Fruge-Brown
Michel Gerard
Katrina Miller Hawking
Michael Kane
Jinchul Kim
Isabella Gibbs Kirkland
Sol Kjøk
Todd Kurtzman
Michael Massenburg
Susan Matthews
Jack Montmeat
Lazarus D. Nazario
Leslie Parke
Natalia Rosenfeld
Gwyneth Scally
Catherine Schmid-Maybach
Eleanor Nanci Seeley
Miroslaw Struzik
Richard Marc Weaver
Holly Jennifer Wong
Victor Zubeldia

2006

Cynthia Consentino
Meghan Cox
Fletcher Crossman
Joan Green
Caspar Henselmann
Jasmine Hernandez
Dale Horstman
Elizabeth Insogna
Edgar Jerins
Joe Kight
Valeri Larko
Geoffrey Laurence
Nina Levy
China Marks
Greg Mueller
Brian Owens
Joyce Polance
Kirstine Reiner
Jane Richlovsky
Lynn Sures
Lois Teicher
Cary Wiegand
Don Williams

2007

Sophia Ainslie
Marlene Aron
Laura N. Atkinson
Becca Bernstein
Aaron Morgan Brown
Crystal Z. Campbell
Ke-Hsin Jenny Chi
Morgan Craig
Sherri Dahl
Alicia DeBrincat CV
Donna Dodson
Keina Davis Elswick
Michael Fitts
Norma Greenwood
Nathaniel Christopher Hester
Lynn Irene Jadamec
Anna Kipervaser
Todd Kurtzman
John Lambert
Anna Lee-Hoelzle
Cathy Lees
Chris Leib
Pamela Matsuda-Dunn
Daniel McCormick
Jim Morris
Arny Nadler
Sarah Wallace Petruziello
Gary Lee Price
Michele Ramirez
Lorna J. Ritz
Darrell Keith Roberts
Dasha Shkurpela
Rene Smith
Gary Haven Smith
Margot Spindelman
Julia Stratton
Suzanne Stryk
Willem Volkersz
Christina Anne West
Holly Jennifer Wong

2008
John E. Stallings

References

External links

The George Sugarman Foundation at Purdue
The radicalism of George Sugarman’s vision

Arts foundations based in the United States
Arts organizations based in the San Francisco Bay Area
Arts organizations established in 2001
2001 establishments in the United States